Midway is an unincorporated community in Johnson County, Tennessee, United States.

References

Unincorporated communities in Johnson County, Tennessee
Unincorporated communities in Tennessee